Sudheimer is an unincorporated community in Maries County, in the U.S. state of Missouri.

History
A post office called Sudheimer was established in 1905, and remained in operation until 1936. The community has the name of the local Sudheimer family.

References

Unincorporated communities in Maries County, Missouri
Unincorporated communities in Missouri